Team dressage equestrian at the 2013 Southeast Asian Games in Wunna Theikdi Equestrian Field, Naypyidaw, Myanmar on December 13, 2014.

Each horse and rider pair performed an FEI Grand Prix Test. The Grand Prix Test consists of a battery of required movements that each rider and horse pair performs. Five judges evaluate the pair, giving marks between 0 and 10 for each element. The judges' scores were averaged to give a final score for the pair. The best three scores from each team's four members were summed to give a team score. The results from this event also served as a qualifier for the individual dressage event.

Schedule
All times are Myanmar Standard Time (UTC+06:30)

Results 
Legend
RT — Retired
WD — Withdrawn
EL — Eliminated
NS — Not Started

References 

Equestrian at the 2013 Southeast Asian Games